The College of Computing is a college of the Georgia Institute of Technology, a public research university in Atlanta, Georgia. It is divided into four schools: the School of Computer Science, the School of Interactive Computing, the School of Computational Science & Engineering, and the School of Cybersecurity and Privacy. The College of Computing's programs are consistently ranked among the top 10 computing programs in the nation. In 2022, U.S. News & World Report ranked the Computer Science graduate program #6 in the U.S. In 2016, Times Higher Education and the Wall Street Journal ranked the College #5 in the world.

The College of Computing has its roots in the creation of an interdisciplinary Master of Science in Information Science at Georgia Tech in 1964. The college still emphasizes an interdisciplinary focus in the structure of its degree programs, among which is a Bachelor of Science in Computational Media that is offered jointly with Georgia Tech's School of Literature, Media, and Communication in the Ivan Allen College of Liberal Arts.

History

Early years
Georgia Tech's College of Computing traces its roots to the establishment of an Information Science degree program established in 1964. In 1963, a group of faculty members led by Dr. Vladimir Slamecka and that included Dr. Vernon Crawford, Dr. Nordiar Waldemar Ziegler, and Dr. William Atchison, noticed an interdisciplinary connection among library science, mathematics, and computer technology. The group drafted an outline for a masters-level program that would combine elements from each of these disciplines. The Georgia Tech administration accepted the plan to establish a Master of Science in Information Science which was first offered in 1964 under the School of Information Science. Dr. Slamecka, who had spearheaded the effort, was named the school's first chair.

In 1970, the school began offering a minor degree program for all Georgia Tech students, and was renamed to the School of Information and Computer Science (ICS). Two years later in 1972, ICS expanded to offer an undergraduate degree for students. It also partnered with Emory University to create a joint graduate program in Biomedical Information and Computer Science, the first partnership of its kind.

In 1979, ICS's first director and primary founder, Dr. Slamecka, retired from the position after 15 years. Dr. Ray Miller, IBM's Assistant Director of Mathematical Sciences, was hired in his place. Under Miller, the School of Information and Computer Science began a trend which began to move away from information science and towards computer science.

College
In John Patrick Crecine's 1988 reorganization of the Institute, the School was broadened as the College of Computing, one of the school's five (and as of 1998, six) colleges. The move toward elevating the school to the status of an academic unit was partly in response to Carnegie Mellon University's creation of their School of Computer Science, and as a result, Georgia Tech was the first university in the United States to have a College of Computing. The school hired its first dean, Peter A. Freeman, in 1990, and further expanded in 2005 with more divisions.

In 2000, successful internet entrepreneur and Tech alum Chris Klaus donated $15 million towards the construction of a new building for the college. At the time of Klaus' contribution, it was the fifth-largest contribution by an individual in Georgia Tech's history. The building was officially opened on October 26, 2006.

Recent history
In February 2007, the divisions were formalized into two schools: the School of Computer Science (SCS) and the School of Interactive Computing (SIC).

In June 2008, College of Computing Dean Richard DeMillo announced plans for his resignation, citing conflicts with Georgia Tech provost and interim president Gary Schuster. DeMillo was temporarily replaced by James D. Foley, a professor in the School of Interactive Computing, until a permanent replacement could be found. On April 9, 2010, Zvi Galil was named the college's new dean.

In March 2010, the division of Computational Science & Engineering (CSE) was also formalized into a school.

The school is involved in DARPA's ADAMS project via the Proactive Discovery of Insider Threats Using Graph Analysis and Learning system.

In May 2013, the school announced that it will offer the first professional Online Master of Science degree in computer science (OMSCS) that can be earned completely through the massive online (MOOC) format in partnership with Udacity. In August 2013, US President Barack Obama praised the school as “a national leader in computer science” that is offering a master's degree in computer science “at a fraction of the cost".

In July 2019, Charles Lee Isbell Jr. took over as dean, replacing Zvi Galil.

In 2020, the School of Cybersecurity and Privacy was founded with Richard DeMillo as its founding chair.

Schools
 School of Computational Science & Engineering
 School of Computer Science
 School of Cybersecurity and Privacy
 School of Interactive Computing

Facilities
CODA Building
College of Computing Building
Klaus Advanced Computing Building
Technology Square Research Building

Academics
The College of Computing offers the B.S., including a degree in Computational Media offered as a joint degree with the Ivan Allen College of Liberal Arts. It also offers the M.S. and Ph.D. in multiple disciplines, including several offered as joint degrees with other colleges in the university. Graduate certificates are also available.

OMSCS

The Online Master of Science in Computer Science (OMSCS) is a MOOC-based degree program leading to a fully accredited Masters qualification, presented in conjunction with Udacity. A contribution of $2 Million from AT&T has funded the initial development of the program as well as continuing integration of technology.

The program is designed and maintained to present a level of academic challenge entirely equivalent to a traditional MSCS course, with equivalent academic rigor as a founding principle. The estimate of the cost of studying the course is however very different; being in the region of $7,000 for a student completing the Masters course in 2 years: composed of the minimum 10 for graduation 3-credit-hour courses at $510 per course plus $301 enrollment fee per semester for say 6 semesters.

The first semester of study, in Spring 2014, some 400 students were enrolled in the program. In January 2015 some 2,000 students were enrolled in the program. As of Spring 2020, enrollment had risen to over 9,500 students, and the program has produced about 3,500 graduates to date.

Enrollment is accessible without restriction on the basis of citizenship, residence, or visa status, to students from all around the world. However, the vast majority of enrolled students are US citizens. The program does, however, mirror the gender imbalance found in many CS courses, with female students considerably outnumbered.

Research
The College of Computing is the third-highest of Georgia Tech's six colleges (behind the larger and older College of Engineering and College of Sciences) in research awards, with 139 proposals worth $93,737,529 resulting in 119 awards worth $14,579,392 in 2006.

There are several organizations tied to or within the College of Computing that are primarily dedicated to research. These include several research groups and labs. Other research-related organizations include:
GVU Center, which is primarily dedicated to computer graphics and human-computer interaction
Center for Experimental Research in Computer Systems, which focuses on hardware aspects of computer science
Georgia Tech Algorithms and Randomness Center ThinkTank
Center for Research into Novel Computing Hierarchies
Machine Learning at Georgia Tech

Affiliated Research Institutes
Institute for People and Technology
Institute for Robotics and Intelligent Machines
Institute for Information Security and Privacy
Institute for Data Engineering and Science

Student life and community
The College of Computing has numerous student organizations which help build a community within the college. These organizations include:

 Anime O-Tekku
 Association for Computing Machinery
 Entertainment Software Producers 
 Freshmen Mentoring Program
 Minorities @ CC 
 Student Activities Board 
 The FIREwall 
 Undergraduate Council 
 Upsilon Pi Epsilon
 Women @ CC 
 Tech Entrepreneurs Society

Alumni

See also
GVU Center
Institute for Personal Robots in Education
Sony Toshiba IBM Center of Competence for the Cell Processor
Center for Robotics and Intelligent Machines

References

External links
Official website

College of Computing
Information schools
Computer science departments in the United States
Educational institutions established in 1964
1964 establishments in Georgia (U.S. state)